SRF info is a German-language Swiss television channel owned by Schweizer Radio und Fernsehen. The channel started trial broadcasts in May 1999 and regular broadcasts in January 2001.

The channel was initially broadcast only via cable and satellite television, but it was also transmitted terrestrially in the German-speaking regions of Switzerland from January 2009 until the cessation of all digital terrestrial television signals across Switzerland on 3 June 2019.

Programming
The main programmes on the channel come from Schweizer Radio und Fernsehen, which have already been aired on SRF 1 and SRF zwei.

During the evenings the channel rebroadcasts the daily news programmes SRF Tagesschau, 10vor10 and Schweiz aktuell.

The channel also rebroadcasts some programmes such as the World Economic Forum annual meeting in Davos.

In 2019, due to scheduling issues, SRF info broadcast the first semi-final of the Eurovision Song Contest 2019, instead of its sister channel SRF zwei.

Logos and identities

References

External links
www.srf.ch/tv

Television stations in Switzerland
Television channels and stations established in 2001
German-language television in Switzerland